Pseudolaguvia muricata is a species of sisorid catfish from the Brahmaputra River drainage in Bangladesh.

References

Catfish of Asia
Fish of India
Taxa named by Heok Hee Ng
Fish described in 2005
Erethistidae